David Kerr (28 June 1923 – 16 February 1989) was an Australian cricketer. He played 16 first-class cricket matches for Victoria between 1946 and 1954.

See also
 List of Victoria first-class cricketers

References

External links
 

1923 births
1989 deaths
Australian cricketers
Victoria cricketers
Cricketers from Melbourne